On 16 February 2020 a large group of gunmen attacked a Protestant service being hosted in the village of Pansi, Burkina Faso. Pansi, a rural village in Yagha Province in the Sahel Region of Burkina Faso, was targeted by terrorists who wanted to loot supplies and dissuade the local population from attending or supporting church services.

Attack
During church services, a group of 20 armed gunmen launched an attack at a Protestant church in the town of Pansi in Yagha Province, after distinguishing the residents from the non-residents. Despite a church being the primary target, both Christians and Muslims were targeted by terrorists. The gunmen took hostages, and forced three of the hostages to transport looted rice and oil from the village on motorbikes.

Many individuals sought medical treatment in  the nearby town Sebba after the attack. The pastor was among those killed.

Aftermath
The West African Director for Human Rights Watch noted how many terrorists use victims' perceived links to governments or faith groups to target their attacks in Burkina Faso's troubled Sahel Region. The attacks on the church in Pansi notably occurred after a 10 February mass kidnapping at a pastor's property in Yagha province, in which 5 individuals (including the pastor) were found dead afterwards. The Pansi church attack highlighted the rise of anti-Christian terrorism in Burkina Faso's Sahel region, occurring during an increase in jihadist attacks for the area.

References 

2020 murders in Burkina Faso
21st-century mass murder in Burkina Faso
Attacks on churches in Africa
February 2020 crimes in Africa
Islamic terrorist incidents in 2020
Islamist attacks on churches
Islamic terrorism in Burkina Faso
Mass murder in 2020
Terrorist incidents in Africa in 2020
Terrorist incidents in Burkina Faso
Yagha Province
Jihadist insurgency in Burkina Faso